Acharya Shri Shantisagar (1872–1955) was an Indian monk of the Digambara school of the Jain faith. He was the first Acharya (preceptor) and a leader of his sect in the 20th century. Shanti Sagar ji revived the teaching and practice of traditional Digambara practices in North India. He was lustrated as a kshullaka into the Sangha (holy order) by Devappa (Devakirti) Swami. He took his ailaka deeksha (religious vows) before an image of the Tirthankara Neminatha. In about 1920, Shantisagar became a full muni (monk) of the Digambara sect of Jainism. In 1922, at Yarnal village, Belgaum district, Karnataka, he was given the name "Shanti Sagara" ("Ocean of Peace").

Early life
Shantisagar ji was born in 1872 near Bhoj village, Belgavi district Karnataka, India. His father either worked as a farmer or was employed in the clothing business. At age eighteen, having read religious texts and undergone several pilgrimages, Shantisagar Ji decided to dedicate his life to a religious order.

Shantisagar Ji's parents died in 1912. He then traveled to the Jain holy place, Shravanabelagola, a town in Hassan district, Karnataka, India. In 1918, whilst in Shravanabelagola, Shantisagar Ji was lustrated as a kshullaka into the Sangha (holy order) by Devappa (Devendrakirti) Swami. He took his ailaka (religious vows) before an image of the Tirthankara Neminatha. In about 1920, Shantisagar became a full muni (monk) of the Digambara sect of Jainism. In 1922, at Yarnal village, Belgaum district, Karnataka, he was given the name "Shanti Sagara" ("Ocean of Peace").

He preached the principles of Jainism in various parts of India and became an Acharya. His disciples also called him "Charitra Chakravarti" ("Emperor of good character"). He has also been called "muniraj" ("King among Ascetics"), and "silasindhi" ("Ocean of Observances").

He began a hunger strike to oppose restrictions imposed on Digambara monks by the British Raj.

His Vihara throughout India

He was the first full Digambar monk and Acharya to wander throughout India. The wandering of a Jain monk is termed "Vihara" an old sramanic term. Padmanabh Jaini writes: 

Acharya Shantisagar took last breath on 18 September 1955 at 6:50 am at Kunthalgiri, Osmanabad district, Maharashtra, India.

Based on the accounts given by Sumeruchandra Diwakar and Dharmachanda Shastri, Shantisagar was born in 1872 to Bhimagauda Patil and Satyavati at Bhoj Village in Belgavi dist., Karnataka, India. His birth name was Satgauda. He was married at the age of nine. His wife died six months after the marriage. In 1905, he made a pilgrimage to Sammed Shikharji accompanied by his sister.

In 1925, Shantisagar was present in Kumbhoj township. He attended the Mahamastakabhisheka (grand consecration) at Shravanbelgola, Karnataka. In 1926, he visited Nanded city, Maharashtra. In 1927, he visited Bahubali, Maharashtra and then Nagpur which was then the capital of the Central provinces. Shantisagar then travelled in east India. He had a Panchakalyanaka blessing at Sammed Shikhar, Jharkhand, a Jain pilgrimage site. He also travelled to Champapur and Pavapur.

In 1928, Shantisagar visited central India. He visited towns including Katni in Madhya Pradesh state, Jabalpur, Sleemanabad, Nohta, Kundalpur and Sagar. In Dronagir, Shantisagar encountered a tiger. By 1929, Shantisagar was in Lalitpur. In Sonagir, four ailaks (researchers). By 1929, Shantisagar was visiting Gwalior and Murena.

Shantisagar travelled to north India. In Rajakheda, Uttar Pradesh, Shantisagar was attacked by a violent crowd. Shantisagar visited Agra, Hastinapur and Firozabad. In 1930, Shantisagar visited Mathura and received a blessing. Shantisagar's presence in Delhi in 1931 is marked by a memorial at Lal Mandir.

In the 1930s, Shantisagar travelled through Western India. He visited the Shri Mahaveer Ji temple, a Jain pilgrimage site. Shantisagar visited Jaipur in 1932, Byavur in 1933, Udaipur in 1934, Goral in Gujarat in 1935, Pratapgarh in 1936 and Gajpantha in Maharashtra in 1937. Around this time, Shri Shantisagar Charitr was written by Muni  Kunthusagar in Sanskrit and in Gajpantha, Shantisagar was given the title, "Charitra Chakravarti". In 1938, Shantisagar visited Baramati, Indore city in Madhya Pradesh. In 1939, he visited Pratapgarh in Uttar Pradesh.

In the 1940s, Shantisagar travelled through Maharashtra state. He visited Goral in 1940, Akluj in 1941, Korochi in 1942, Digraj in 1943, Kunthalgiri in 1944, Phaltan in 1945, and Kavalana in 1946. Then in 1947, at the time of Partition, Shantisagar was in Sholapur. In a miracle, in Shantisagar's presence, a mute young man began to speak. In 1948, Shantisagar was in Phaltan. He was in Kavlana in 1949.

In the 1950s, Shantisagar continued to travel in Maharashtra state. He was in Gajpantha in 1950, Baramati in 1951, Lonand in 1952, and Kunthalgiri in 1953. In 1953, Sumeruchandra Diwakar's book, Charitra Chakravarti was published. In 1954, there was preservation of the Dhavala books.

Sallekhana Or Samadhi 
In 1955, Shantisagar arrived in Kunthalgiri town. On 18 September 1955, he completed the practice of Sallekhana, a gradual reducing of intake of fluid and food leading to death. Sumeruchandra Diwakar, Bhattarakas Lakshmisen and Jinasen arrived in the town. Acharya Shantisagar attained utkrushta samadhimaran after the 35th / 36th day of fasting. The title of Acharya pada (teacher of philosophy) was awarded to Muni Virasagar.

Padmanabh Jaini writes about his Sallekhana:

His lineage (parampara)
He had handed over the leadership to the next Acharya Virasagar (1955–1957). He was followed by, in sequence, Acharya Shivasagar (1957–1969), Dharmasagar (1969–1987), Ajitasagar (1987–1990) and then Vardhamansagar (since 1990) who currently leads his sangha. There are numerous Digambar Jain monks who belong to this tradition. Acharya Gyansagar, the guru of Acharya Vidyasagar, was initiated by Acharya Shivasagar.

Acharya Shantisagar Chhani
Acharya Shantisagar is sometimes termed Acharya Shantisagar (Dakshin) to contrast him with Acharya Shantisagar "Chhani" (North) (1888–1944).
 
Chhani is a district in Udaipur. They were thus contemporary. Modern Acharya Gyansagar (born 1957) was initially initiated by Acharya Vidyasagar as a Kashullaka, later he was initiated as a full Digambar Muni by Acharya Sumatisagar belonging to the lineage of Acharya Shantisagar Chhani.

Contemporary to both of them, there was a third Jain Muni Aadisagar Ankalikar (1809–1887). Late Acharya Vimalsagar, belonged to his lineage.

See also
Bhadrabahu
Kundakunda

References

Citations

Sources

External links

Digambara Acharyas
1872 births
1955 deaths
Indian Jain monks
20th-century Indian Jains
20th-century Jain monks
20th-century Indian monks
1955 suicides
Suicides by starvation
Suicides in India